Melrakkaey (lit. Fox Island) is an Island located in the Grundarfjörður municipality in Western Iceland. 
The island has been declared a protected area. Consequently, entering the island without permission or hunting within a 2 km radius of the island is prohibited.

History
Throughout its history, Melrakkaey has been used as a source of food by locals. The ocean surrounding the island provided fish and fishing outposts were built on the island, many bird species call the basalt cliffs of Melrakkaey home, providing a stable source of meat and eggs. Furthermore, the Island was used as a larder by locals.

Melrakkaey was a possession of the Setberg since the 14th century. Setberg came into the ownership of Melrakkaey when a local elderly woman lost her two sons at sea and pledged the island to the church.
The reverends of Setberg used the island to farm hay every summer and a house was built on the island to accommodate workers.
Due to the island being a possession of Setberg, Danish sailors called the island "The Reverend’s Island".

In 1971, Malrakkaey became a protected area to protect the bird population on the island.

References

Sources
"MELRAKKAEY". nat.is. Retrieved July 28, 2020.
"Melrakkaey". ust.is (in Icelandic). Retrieved July 28, 2020.
"Information about Melrakkaey". guidetoiceland.is. Retrieved July 28, 2020.

Grundarfjörður
Islands of Iceland